The Toronto Rock are a lacrosse team based in Toronto playing in the National Lacrosse League (NLL). The 2017 season is the 20th in franchise history, and 19th as the Rock.

Regular season

Finalstandings

Game log

Regular season

Playoffs

Roster

Entry Draft
The 2016 NLL Entry Draft took place on September 26, 2016. The Rock made the following selections:

See also
2017 NLL season

References

Toronto
Toronto Rock
2017 in Canadian sports